Ena Exypno Exypno... Moutro, (English translation, "A Smart Smart... Face" also known as O Achtypitos is a 1965 Greek black and white comedy film made by Finos Films and based on a theatrical play by Tsiforos O Tilemahos Triposse (Ο Τηλέμαχος Τρύπωσε).  It was directed by Andreas Andreakis, written by Giannis Dalianidis and Nikos Tsiforos.

The movie premiered on February 18, 1965 and made about 300,000 tickets in its first run.

Cast
Vassilis Avlonitis .... Potis
Kostas Voutsas .... Mahos
Nikos Rizos .... Iordanis
Nini Janet .... Nana
Elsa Rizou .... Toula
Alekos Tzanetakos .... Paschalis
Nana Skiada .... Amalia
Eleni Kriti .... Mina
Athinodoros Proussalis .... Babis Kantourakis
Kostas Fyssoun .... Vasos

See also
List of Greek films

External links

Ena Exypno Exypno Moutro at cine.gr

1965 films
1965 comedy films
1960s Greek-language films
Finos Film films
Greek comedy films